Tom Morrissey was a Gaelic footballer from Cooraclare County Clare. He won a Munster Senior Football Championship in 1992 when Clare had a surprise win over Kerry in the final. He won McGrath Cup medals in 1994 and 1995.

Honours
 Munster Senior Football Championship (1) 1992
 McGrath Cup (3) 1992 1994 1995
 National Football League Division 2 (2) 1992 1995

References

External links
 http://www.hoganstand.com/clare/ArticleForm.aspx?ID=42502
 http://www.hoganstand.com/Clare/ArticleForm.aspx?ID=115178

Clare inter-county Gaelic footballers
Cooraclare Gaelic footballers
Living people
Year of birth missing (living people)